WGRV-LP (93.1 FM) was a radio station consisting of a series of low power transmitters throughout the Brevard/Indian River area of Florida.  This non-commercial station broadcast a smooth jazz format supported by its listeners.  The station was licensed to Melbourne, Florida, United States, and served the Melbourne area.  The station was owned by Brevard Youth Education Broadcasting Corporation.  The station was a network of low power transmitters in the Brevard area broadcasting on 93.1 (WGRV-LP), 103.3 Palm Bay, 103.3 in the Cocoa Beach area, 102.3 in the Cape Canaveral area and 100.7 FM in the Rockledge area.

History
The station was originally assigned the call letters WCEE-LP on June 18, 2002.  On March 31, 2005, the station changed its call sign to WGRZ-LP. On March 12, 2007, it changed again to the current WGRV. However, as of March 25, 2013 the station went off the air and has filed a STA to remain dark for six months.

As of November 9, 2013, WGRV-LP remains silent, with no immediate plans to resume broadcasting. The station is currently listed in the FCC database as "licensed and silent." According to a message on the station's web site, the station is off the air indefinitely due to life changes and health issues among the station's key staff.

WGRV-LP's call sign was deleted and its license cancelled by the FCC on June 24, 2014.  The record can be viewed using the FCC's CDBS station search tool using the call letters DWGRV-LP. The "D" at the front stands for "deleted".  The FM translators that were part of the network are still licensed, but since they have also been silent for more than a year, the law requires that the FCC delete them as well unless they have switched inputs and are rebroadcasting another station.

Awards
The station was nominated for the Smooth Jazz Radio Station Of The Year by Radio and Records magazine in 2006 and 2007.

Translators

References

External links
 

GRV-LP
Radio stations established in 2002
GRV-LP
Brevard County, Florida
2002 establishments in Florida
Defunct radio stations in the United States
Radio stations disestablished in 2014
2014 disestablishments in Florida
GRV-LP